The Flint Firebirds are a major junior ice hockey team based in Flint, Michigan. The team plays home games at the Dort Federal Credit Union Event Center, and operates as a member of the Ontario Hockey League (OHL). The team began play for the 2015–16 season. In June 2019, the Firebirds announced the Leamington Flyers (GOJHL) as an affiliate.

History

The Firebirds trace their roots back to the 1990–91 season, when the Detroit Compuware Ambassadors were added as an expansion team in the OHL. Since then, the franchise has been the Detroit Junior Red Wings, the Detroit Whalers and the Plymouth Whalers. On January 14, 2015, it was announced that longtime Whalers owner Peter Karmanos had sold the team to IMS USA, Inc., with the intention to move the franchise to Flint and the Perani Arena. The purchase and relocation was approved by the OHL on February 2, 2015.

Although there was sentiment towards resurrecting the Flint Generals nickname that had been used by two past teams in the city, the OHL quickly nixed that idea because of the Oshawa Generals using that name. Likewise, a popular suggestion was the Flint Tropics, after the fictional American Basketball Association team of that name in the 2008 movie Semi-Pro. However, after various others voiced their displeasure at their team possibly being named after a comedy movie's protagonist team, and the chance of the novelty wearing off after a while, the name did not make the list of finalist choices.

The nine finalist nicknames were Firebirds, Force, Fury, Nationals, Pride, Spark Plugs, Sparks, United, and Vikings.

Coaching controversies
The Firebirds garnered international attention in November 2015 when, following an overtime victory over the Oshawa Generals, owner Rolf Nilsen fired the team's entire coaching staff for failing to adequately increase the playing time of his son, Håkon Nilsen, a Firebirds' defenseman described by one NHL player agent as "a borderline OHL player". Prior to the game against Oshawa, the entire team with the exception of Hakon Nilsen met with head coach John Gruden and his staff and were informed that the owner had insisted that his son receive more playing time, and indeed Nilsen ultimately played 17 minutes, including power-play time, in the subsequent game. However, head coach John Gruden has denied that this was the reason for his dismissal. In response to the firings, the entire team, including Håkon Nilsen, stormed into the team's front office, threw their jerseys on the floor, and quit the team in a show of solidarity with the coaching staff.

The player revolt proved to be successful, as less than 24 hours later the coaching staff was not only rehired, but given three-year contract extensions. Following a meeting with OHL commissioner David Branch, Firebirds' owner Rolf Nilsen stated publicly that he had made an "irresponsible mistake" and apologized to the players.

On February 17, 2016, Rolf Nilsen again fired head coach John Gruden and assistant coach Dave Karpa. The next day, OHL Commissioner David Branch suspended Nilsen, as well as his appointees on the management and coaching staff, from hockey operations until further notice. The league also ordered counseling be provided to players, at Nilsen's cost. Nilsen and his staff were then ordered to cooperate with a league investigation and comply with its findings. On April 6, 2016, the OHL suspended Nilsen for five years, with no requests for reinstatement to be entertained for three years. He was also fined $250,000. The league also stripped the Firebirds of their 2016 first-round draft pick. Had Nilsen attempted to get involved in hockey operations while suspended, the OHL could have forced him to sell the Firebirds. The OHL placed the Firebirds under league stewardship and appointed Joe Birch as director of operations. After the five-year suspension passed, the OHL reinstated Rolf Nilsen on April 6, 2021.

Recent history

In May 2016, the OHL named George Burnett, former head coach and general manager of the Belleville Bulls, as the new general manager. The OHL then appointed Ryan Oulahen as head coach and Eric Wellwood as an assistant. On October 12, 2018, Ryan Oulahen stepped down as head coach. On October 18, former associate coach Eric Wellwood was named head coach.

On February 21, 2020, the Firebirds won their 15th consecutive game, setting a new franchise record. It was their 37th win of the season, another club record.

Head coaches
List of coaches with multiple seasons in parentheses.
2015–2016 – John Gruden
2016–2017 – Ryan Oulahen
2017–2018 – Ryan Oulahen, Eric Wellwood
2018–2021 – Eric Wellwood (3)
2021–present – Ted Dent (2)

General managers
List of general managers with multiple seasons in parentheses.
2015–2016 – Terry Christensen
2016–2017 – George Burnett
2017–2021 – Barclay Branch (4)
2021–2022 – Terry Christensen
2022–present – Ted Dent

Players

Team captains
List of team captains:

2015–2017: Alex Peters
2017–2018: Ryan Moore / Jalen Smereck
2018–2020: Ty Dellandrea
2021–2022: Brennan Othmann

NHL alumni
List of Firebirds alumni who played in the National Hockey League (NHL):

 Nick Caamano
 Ty Dellandrea
 Alex Nedeljkovic
 Vili Saarijärvi
 Kole Sherwood
 Vladislav Kolyachonok

Season-by-season results
Season-by-season results for the regular season and playoffs:

Regular season
Legend: OTL = Overtime loss, SOL = Shootout loss

Playoffs
2015–16: Out of playoffs
2016–17: Lost to Sault Ste. Marie Greyhounds 4 games to 1 in conference quarter-finals
2017–18: Out of playoffs
2018–19: Out of playoffs
2019–20: Playoffs cancelled
2020–21: Season cancelled
2021–22: Defeated Owen Sound Attack 4 games to 3 in conference quarter-finals.  Defeated Sault Ste. Marie Greyhounds 4 games to 1 in conference semi-finals.  Lost to Windsor Spitfires 4 games to 3 in conference finals.

Radio and television
Jack Sznewajs is the play-by-play voice of the Firebirds. On radio, games are broadcast live on WQUS (103.1 FM). Telecasts are streamed online via CHL TV and the OHL Action Pak.

References

External links

2015 establishments in Michigan
Amateur ice hockey teams in Michigan
Ice hockey clubs established in 2015
Ice hockey teams in Flint, Michigan
Ontario Hockey League teams